Ogoya Glacier is the 8 km long and 3 km wide glacier on Trinity Peninsula, Antarctic Peninsula.  Situated west-northwest of Laclavère Plateau, northwest of Broad Valley and northeast of Sestrimo Glacier.  Draining the northeast slopes of Morro del Paso Peak, the north side of Misty Pass and the northwest slopes of Dabnik Peak, and flowing northwards to enter Huon Bay in Bransfield Strait.

The glacier is named after the settlement of Ogoya in northwestern Bulgaria.

Location
German-British mapping in 1996.

See also
 List of glaciers in the Antarctic
 Glaciology

Maps
 Trinity Peninsula. Scale 1:250000 topographic map No. 5697. Institut für Angewandte Geodäsie and British Antarctic Survey, 1996.
 Antarctic Digital Database (ADD). Scale 1:250000 topographic map of Antarctica. Scientific Committee on Antarctic Research (SCAR). Since 1993, regularly updated.

References
 Bulgarian Antarctic Gazetteer. Antarctic Place-names Commission. (details in Bulgarian, basic data in English)
 Ogoya Glacier. SCAR Composite Antarctic Gazetteer

External links
 Ogoya Glacier. Copernix satellite image

Glaciers of Trinity Peninsula
Bulgaria and the Antarctic